The commissioner of Nunavut (Inuinnaqtun: Kamisinauyuq Nunavunmut) is the Government of Canada's representative in the territory of Nunavut. The current commissioner since January 14, 2021 is Eva Aariak.

The commissioner is appointed to represent the Canadian federal government and performs many of the same duties of lieutenant governors in Canadian provinces, such as swearing in members of the Legislative Assembly of Nunavut and approving territorial legislation. However, unlike a lieutenant governor or the governor general of Canada, the commissioner is not a viceroy and does not represent the Canadian monarch.

History
The position was created in 1999 with the creation of the new Nunavut territory. Like other territorial commissioners, the commissioner is appointed by the Government of Canada and represents the Canadian cabinet in the territory.

Note. Prior to April 1, 1999, Nunavut was part of the Northwest Territories. See Commissioners of Northwest Territories.

Deputy commissioner
The role of deputy commissioner was added in 2005 by amending the Public Officer Act and Seals Act to be inline with the Yukon and Northwest Territories.

Duties
The duties of the commissioner are similar to that of the lieutenant governors of the provinces. However, since commissioners represent the Government of Canada rather than the Crown, they are not viceroys.

References

External links

Official Handbook for Commissioners of the Territories (Canada)
Coat of Arms of Nunavut

Nunavut
Commissioners
Nunavut politics-related lists